Murugeysen Tiruchelvam, QC (19 November 1907 - 23 November 1976) was a Sri Lankan Tamil lawyer and politician. Tiruchelvam was a leading lawyer having served as the Solicitor General of Ceylon; he served as the Cabinet Minister of Local Government as a member of Senate of Ceylon.

Early life
Tiruchelvam was born on 19 November 1907 in Jaffna. When he was three-months old he and his mother went to British Malaya where his father Visvanathan Murugeysu, who hailed from Vaddukoddai, was Head of the Telegraph Office, an officer in the British colonial administration, in Kuala Lumpur. The Tiruchelvam family were friends of the Chelvanayakam family who were also living in Malaya. Tiruchelvam had three brothers and a sister. Tiruchelvam and his brother Rajendra were sent to British Ceylon to have their education at S. Thomas' College, Mount Lavinia. S. J. V. Chelvanayakam was the brothers' guardian. Tiruchelvam later studied at Ceylon University College, obtaining an honours degree in History.

Legal career
After graduating Tiruchelvam studied law at the Ceylon Law College and became an advocate in 1933 when he started practicing law in the unofficial bar. He served as the acting/additional magistrate in Negombo, Panadura and Galle till 1945. He was appointed Acting Assistant to the Legal Secretary to the then Legal Secretary Sir Alan Rose. He assisted Sir Alan in drafting the Soulbury Constitution. Tiruchelvam was appointed Crown Counsel in October 1947 and was promoted to Senior Crown Counsel in October 1949. He was appointed Solicitor General of Ceylon in 1957, a position he held until 1960. He took silks as a Queen's Counsel in 1959. 

Following his retirement he reverted to the unofficial bar. During this time Tiruchelvam took part in a number of high-profile legal cases. He was one of the defence lawyers in the 1976 Trial-At-Bar of Appapillai Amirthalingam, K. P. Ratnam, Murugesu Sivasithamparam and Kathiripillai Thurairatnam, four leading TULF politicians who were charged with sedition for defying the First Republican Constitution. 72 Tamil lawyers took part in the defence, including S. J. V. Chelvanayakam and G. G. Ponnambalam, two leading lawyer-politicians. All the defendants were acquitted. Tiruchelvam also defended Junius Richard Jayewardene when he was threatened with expulsion from the United National Party in 1972.

Political career
Tiruchelvam became involved in politics in the 1960s, becoming chief advisor and principal political strategist to S. J. V. Chelvanayakam, founder/leader of Illankai Tamil Arasu Kachchi (Federal Party). Tiruchelvam and other ITAK leaders were jailed in 1961 for staging a mass satyagraha against the Sinhala Only Act. They spent over six months in Panagoda jail.

Minister of Local Government
In 1965, after the signing of the Senanayake-Chelvanayakam Pact (aka Dudley-Chelvanayakam Pact), ITAK joined the United National Party-led national government. ITAK's MP refused take ministerial portfolios but instead Tiruchelvam was appointed to the Senate of Ceylon and made Cabinet Minister of Local Government. During Tiruchelvam's ministerial tenure the eventual creation of the University of Jaffna was started, the Tamil Language Special Provisions Act (aka Reasonable Use of Tamil Act) became law in 1966 and administrative reforms carried out.

Tiruchelvam resigned from the government in November 1968 when Prime Minister Dudley Senanayake overturned his decision to make Fort Fredrick in Trincomalee a sacred precinct (the fort contained the Koneswaram temple). He was succeeded by his Parliamentary Secretary Ranasinghe Premadasa. ITAK then left the national government, blaming the government's failure to implement the Senanayake-Chelvanayakam Pact. Tiruchelvam stayed on in the Senate until it was abolished in 1971.

He died on 23 November 1976.

Family
Tiruchelvam married Punithavathy (Punitham) Canagaratnam. They had four children: Neelan Tiruchelvam, Kamini, Janaki, Vasudevan. His son Neelan Tiruchelvam, became a leading human rights activist and member of parliament

References

Notes

Bibliography

External links
 Senator M Tiruchelvam QC

1907 births
1976 deaths
Local government and provincial councils ministers of Sri Lanka
Members of the Senate of Ceylon
Solicitors General of Ceylon
Ceylonese advocates
Ceylonese Queen's Counsel
Sri Lankan Tamil lawyers
Sri Lankan Tamil politicians
Illankai Tamil Arasu Kachchi politicians
Tamil United Liberation Front politicians
Alumni of S. Thomas' College, Mount Lavinia
Alumni of the Ceylon University College
Alumni of Ceylon Law College